The 2007 Korea Open Super Series (officially known as the Yonex Korea Open Super Series 2007 for sponsorship reasons) was a badminton tournament which took place at SK Olympic Handball Gymnasium in Seoul, South Korea, from 23 to 28 January 2007 and had a total purse of $300,000.

Tournament 
The 2007 Korea Open Super Series was the second tournament of the 2007 BWF Super Series and also part of the Korea Open championships, which had been held since 1991.

Venue 
This international tournament was held at SK Olympic Handball Gymnasium in Seoul, South Korea.

Point distribution 
Below is the point distribution for each phase of the tournament based on the BWF points system for the BWF Super Series event.

Prize money 
The total prize money for this tournament was US$300,000. Distribution of prize money was in accordance with BWF regulations.

Men's singles

Seeds 

 Lin Dan (champion)
 Lee Chong Wei (quarter-finals)
 Chen Hong (first round)
 Peter Gade (withdrew)
 Bao Chunlai (semi-finals)
 Chen Jin (final)
 Kenneth Jonassen (first round)
 Lee Hyun-il (first round)

Finals

Top half

Section 1

Section 2

Bottom half

Section 3

Section 4

Women's singles

Seeds 

 Zhang Ning (withdrew)
 Xie Xingfang (champion)
 Wang Chen (second round)
 Huaiwen Xu (quarter-finals)
 Lu Lan (semi-finals)
 Pi Hongyan (first round)
 Yao Jie (second round)
 Zhu Lin (final)

Finals

Top half

Section 1

Section 2

Bottom half

Section 3

Section 4

Men's doubles

Seeds 

 Fu Haifeng / Cai Yun (quarter-finals)
 Jens Eriksen / Martin Lundgaard Hansen (quarter-finals)
 Choong Tan Fook / Lee Wan Wah (quarter-finals)
 Jung Jae-sung / Lee Yong-dae (champions)
 Anthony Clark / Robert Blair (second round)
 Markis Kido / Hendra Setiawan (quarter-finals)
 Lee Jae-jin / Hwang Ji-man (final)
 Tony Gunawan /  Chandra Wijaya (semi-finals)

Finals

Top half

Section 1

Section 2

Bottom half

Section 3

Section 4

Women's doubles

Seeds 

 Gao Ling / Huang Sui (champions)
 Yang Wei / Zhang Jiewen (final)
 Lee Kyung-won / Lee Hyo-jung (semi-finals)
 Zhang Yawen / Wei Yili (semi-finals)
 Du Jing / Zhao Tingting (quarter-finals)
 Gail Emms / Donna Kellogg (first round)
 Endang Nursugianti / Rani Mundiasti (second round)
 Wong Pei Tty / Chin Eei Hui (first round)

Finals

Top half

Section 1

Section 2

Bottom half

Section 3

Section 4

Mixed doubles

Seeds 

 Nova Widianto / Lilyana Natsir (second round)
 Sudket Prapakamol / Saralee Thungthongkam (quarter-finals)
 Anthony Clark / Donna Kellogg (second round)
 Xie Zhongbo / Zhang Yawen (semi-finals)
 Nathan Robertson / Gail Emms (semi-finals)
 Zheng Bo / Gao Ling (champions)
 Thomas Laybourn / Kamilla Rytter Juhl (final)
 Zhang Jun / Zhao Tingting (first round)

Finals

Top half

Section 1

Section 2

Bottom half

Section 3

Section 4

References

External links 
Tournament Link

Korea Open (badminton)
Open Super Series
Sport in Seoul
Korea Open